Thomas Francis Mullady (born January 30, 1957) is a former American football tight end and wide receiver who played in the National Football League for the New York Giants from 1979-1984. He was selected by the Buffalo Bills in the 1979 NFL Draft from Rhodes College.  Mullady graduated from The McCallie School in Chattanooga, Tennessee in 1975 where he was a member of the varsity football team.  His teammate at McCallie, Ed Smith (linebacker), also went on to a successful pro football career.

References

1957 births
Living people
Players of American football from Dayton, Ohio
American football tight ends
American football wide receivers
Rhodes Lynx football players
New York Giants players